Ploscuțeni is a commune located in Vrancea County, Romania. It is composed of two villages, Argea and Ploscuțeni.

At the 2011 census, of the inhabitants for whom data were available, 99.9% were Romanians. 72.3% were Roman Catholic and 27.6% Romanian Orthodox.

References

Communes in Vrancea County
Localities in Western Moldavia